Lars Martin Wiklund, professionally known as Martin Wave, is a Swedish songwriter, multi-instrumentalist, singer and music producer residing in Los Angeles. In addition to his work in the cinematic space, he has become a collaborator on a list of artist projects across pop, R&B, electronic and hip hop.

Martin has landed placements in film, TV, trailers, promotions, commercials and gaming, including the official trailers for John Wick: Chapter 3 - Parabellum, Ad Astra (film), and Mortal Engines (film) and scoring the likes of World of Warcraft, FIFA, and Swedish-folk music inspired Drimfrost Studio’s Bramble The Mountain King.

Recent pop cuts include “Here’s Your Song” by Chloe Lilac, “Numb”, "Letting Go" & "No Words" by Dotan (singer), "Ghost" by Christopher (singer), an official remix of "FUN!" by Vince Staples, "Too Much Of A Good Thing" by Pell (musician) and the majority of COTIS' project.

References

Production discography 

Swedish songwriters